Hyperium Records was a German independent record label specializing in darkwave, neoclassical, ethereal, gothic rock, and ambient music, founded by Oliver Roesch (also known as "Oli" Roesch) and Oliver van Essenberg in 1991. Roesch died on August 1, 2002 in a motorcycle accident.

Releases

Heavenly Voices compilations
Hyperium released a series of Heavenly Voices compilation series, which featured prominent use of female vocals in a neo-classical, neofolk, world music, trip hop or ethereal style. "Heavenly Voices" has often been used as a genre term, particularly during the mid to late 1990s. Love Is Colder Than Death claim that the series was inspired by their music.

The first few compilations featured music by many of the label's own artists, as well as guest appearance by other notable bands of the ethereal/gothic/darkwave scene including Bel Canto, Faith & the Muse, Gitane Demone, In The Nursery, Miranda Sex Garden, Ordo Equitum Solis and The Moon Seven Times. In 1997, American independent label Cleopatra Records released a Hyperium licensed compilation called Heavenly Voices subtitled, "A collection of the finest female vocals in ethereal, darkwave & gothic".

Artists
The following are artists with releases on Hyperium Records:

 !Bang Elektronika
 Attrition
 Autopsia
 Calva y Nada
 Chandeen
 Claire Voyant
 Clock DVA
 Dark Orange
 Die Form
 Digital Factor
 Digital Poodle
 Eleven Shadows
 Forthcoming Fire
 Jarboe
 The Wake
 Louisa John-Krol
 Love Is Colder Than Death
 Mellonta Tauta
 Mynox Layh
 Regenerator
 Sleeping Dogs Wake
 Still Patient?
 Stoa
 Sweet William
 The Tors of Dartmoor
 Rise And fall of a Decade
 Speaking Silence

The following artists were co-released by Hyperium Records and Projekt Records:
 Attrition
 Black Tape for a Blue Girl
 Bleak
 Eden
 Human Drama
 Love Spirals Downwards
 Soul Whirling Somewhere

References

External links
 Discogs page for Hyperium

German record labels
Record labels established in 1991
Record labels disestablished in 2002
German independent record labels
Electronic music record labels
Goth record labels
Ambient music record labels
1991 establishments in Germany